A living funeral, also called a pre-funeral, is a funeral held for a living person. It may be important to the person's psychological state and also that of the dying person's family to attend the living funeral.  It is also sometimes used as a time to read the will and explain the reasons behind some of the decisions contained within it.

Purpose
A living funeral is usually done by someone who knows that they do not have much time left to live. Whether the reason is that the person is terminally ill or is at an old age, the person knows death is near and could use it as closure. It is used to celebrate the happy times, and forgive the body for "failing".

Cost
Money is a big part of living funerals. This is another reason that people have them. Regular funeral prices can be extremely high. Having a living funeral can save some money. Some feel that the living funeral is more meaningful.  In the end, it can be around the same price for the living funeral ceremony and when the person does eventually die, the burial or cremation.

Aspects
Most living funerals have the same aspects of a normal funeral, the deceased person aside.  A common theme is for the funeral to start off the same way that a normal funeral would; sombre music, a casket, bible readings, etc. From there the tone is usually switched. Different music is played along with a happier atmosphere. The goal is for this to celebrate a life and to give thanks to everyone attending. This ceremony is often a very happy event where there can be closure. During a living funeral, families and friends will share stories and memories of the person who is nearing death. The soon-to-be-deceased person often speaks about their life and who has affected it. Many people want to be able to show their appreciation through the living funeral. Friends and family of the person hosting the funeral will say things that they would have said at a normal funeral, except now their loved one is there to hear it.

Japan
Living funerals, called  in Japanese, started being done in Japan in the 1990s. Elders in Japan feel that they are burdening their children with their old age. They are ashamed of their failing body. By having a living funeral they feel that they can take some of the stress away from the funeral. After this ceremony many Japanese "expect nothing" from their families after they die, including a funeral.

Controversy
There is a lot of controversy surrounding living funerals.

Critics believe funerals should be performed after death. They may feel that this is the only way to truly respect the dead. In Japan a living funeral is also considered "a denial of ancestral significance."

Living funerals can also be seen as egocentric because the person having the funeral might use it as an opportunity to brag, since listing accomplishments during one's life is often a popular thing to do during this ceremony. However, Mizunoe Takiko, who had a living funeral on television, said that the purpose of her funeral was "to express appreciation to all those who have been dear to me while I am still alive."

Fiction

Atlanta
Coming 2 America
Empire Records
Futurama (Season 3, Episode 17: "A Pharaoh to Remember")
Get Low
Hiccups
Little House on the Prairie
The Living Wake
Mrs. Brown's Boys
Red vs. Blue
The Weather Man
The Fault in Our Stars
Boston Legal (Season 2, Episode 14)
Tom Sawyer
Grace and Frankie (Season 2, Episode 12: "The Party")
The Good Place (In Season 4, Episode 8, "The Funeral to End All Funerals," the four human characters, who have all died, had their deaths reversed, died again, while also living through 803 rebooted versions of the afterlife, hold a living funeral for themselves in their 804th version of the afterlife, even though one of the characters is unconscious and none of them are technically alive)
New Amsterdam (Season 2, Episode 13)
Sinterklaas is Coming to Town
Curb Your Enthusiasm (Season 11, Episode 1)

Non-fiction
Tuesdays with Morrie
One of the more famous living funerals was for Morrie Schwartz, as documented in both the book and film Tuesdays with Morrie and feature Detroit Free Press sports columnist Mitch Albom as one of the central characters.  Living funerals became much more popular because of Tuesdays with Morrie. He brought up the question of why one should wait until he is dead to be appreciated. "What a waste," he said. "All those people saying all those wonderful things, and Irv never got to hear any of it."

References

Death customs